Bhola Polytechnic Institute  or BhPI is a government polytechnic Institute located at Bhola, the largest Island of Bangladesh. It was established in 2005 with four departments. It now offers 4-years Diploma in Engineering courses in each department.

Location 
Bhola Polytechnic Institute is located at Bhorhanuddin Upazila of Bhola District.

Departments and seats
There are seven technologies/departments. They are: 
 Computer technology - 120
 Civil technology - 240
 Electronics technology - 120
 Refrigeration and air condition technology - 120

References

External links 
 Official website

Polytechnic institutes in Bangladesh
Educational institutions established in 2005
2005 establishments in Bangladesh